Dr. Crippen is a 1963 British biographical film directed by Robert Lynn and starring Donald Pleasence, Coral Browne and Samantha Eggar. The film's plot concerns the real-life Edwardian doctor Hawley Harvey Crippen, who was hanged in 1910 for the murder of his wife. The cinematography was by Nicolas Roeg.

Plot
Crippen is portrayed as a downtrodden cuckold continually humiliated by his coarse, overbearing wife. There is a strong suggestion in the story that he may have been innocent of murder, possibly killing his wife by accident, and that his younger mistress Ethel Le Neve is completely ignorant of the killing. The plot ostensibly covers Crippen's trial but the story is fleshed out with flashbacks to the doctor's relationship with his wife and his affair.

Cast
 Donald Pleasence as Dr. Crippen 
 Coral Browne as Belle Elmore/Cora Crippen 
 Samantha Eggar as Ethel Le Neve 
 Donald Wolfit as R.D. Muir 
 James Robertson Justice as Captain McKenzie 
 John Arnatt as Chief Inspector Dew
 Oliver Johnston as Lord Chief Justice
 Geoffrey Toone as Mr. Tobin
 Edward Underdown as the Prison Governor

Critical reception
Bosley Crowther in The New York Times wrote, "well, one must give good scores to Mr. Pleasence, Miss Browne, Miss Eggar and the rest of the cast for giving a sense of solemnity and suffocation to this stiff tale...the mystery, the action and the pathos are all too academic and thin—too milky and uneventful — except for those who are real Crippen fans". Britmovie noted a "sincere historical reconstruction about the infamous Edwardian murderer blending courtroom and melodrama. The direction from tv helmer Robert Lynn is satisfactory and is brightly captured in atmospheric black-and-white by cinematographer Nicolas Roeg."

References

External links

1963 films
1960s biographical drama films
1960s historical films
British crime drama films
British biographical drama films
British black-and-white films
British courtroom films
British films based on actual events
Films set in London
1962 drama films
Films shot at Associated British Studios
1960s English-language films
1960s British films